The men's shot put event at the 1970 European Athletics Indoor Championships was held on 15 March in Vienna.

Results

References

Shot put at the European Athletics Indoor Championships
Shot